Bağdaşen (Kinzodamal) is a village in the western part of the Ardahan District, Ardahan Province, Turkey. Its population is 910 (2021).

References

Villages in Ardahan District